Il cavaliere e la dama is a comedy play by Venetian playwright Carlo Goldoni. It was published in 1749.

References 

Plays by Carlo Goldoni
1749 plays